Earl Fitzgerald Beecham (born September 8, 1965) is a former American football running back who played one season with the New York Giants of the National Football League. He played college football at Bucknell University and attended Great Neck South High School in Great Neck, New York.

References

External links
Just Sports Stats

Living people
1965 births
American football running backs
Bucknell Bison football players
New York Giants players
Players of American football from New York City
William A. Shine Great Neck South High School alumni